Garcia I may refer to:

 García I Jiménez of Gascony, duke of Gascony, leader of the Gascons from 816 to his death in 818
 García I Galíndez, count of Aragon (d. 833)
 García Íñiguez of Pamplona (died 882) 
 García I of León (died 914)
 García Sánchez I of Pamplona (c. 919 – 970) 
 García I of Castile (died 995) 
 Garcia I of Kongo (ruled 1624–1626)